The sixteenth edition of the South American Championship was held in Santiago, Chile from 2 February to 4 March.

With the purpose of celebrating the fourth centenary of Santiago's foundation by Pedro de Valdivia, Chile requested to host this tournament's edition. Because of that, this edition is considered extra (no trophy was handed to the winners).

The participating countries were Argentina, Chile, Ecuador, Peru, and Uruguay.

Bolivia, Brazil, Colombia and Paraguay withdrew from the tournament.

Squads

Venues

Final round
Each team played against each of the other teams. Two points were awarded for a win, one point for a draw and zero points for a defeat.

Result

Goal scorers

5 goals
  Juan Marvezzi

3 goals

  José Manuel Moreno
  Teodoro Fernández
  Ismael Rivero

2 goals

  Raúl Pérez
  Enrique Sorrel

1 goal

  Enrique García
  Antonio Sastre
  Armando Contreras
  Raúl Toro
  César Freire
  César Socarraz
  Manuel  Vallejas
  Oscar Chirimini
  Ubaldo Cruche
  Schubert Gambetta
  Obdulio Varela
  Roberto Porta
  Juan P. Riephoff

Own Goal
  Jorge Laurido (for Uruguay)

External links
 South American Championship 1941 at RSSSF

1941
1941
1941 in South American football
1941 in Argentine football
1941 in Chilean football
1941 in Uruguayan football
1941 in Ecuador
February 1941 sports events
March 1941 sports events
Sports competitions in Santiago
1940s in Santiago, Chile